Purity Factories Limited is a food processing company based in St. John's, Newfoundland and Labrador.

Founded in 1924 by C. C. Pratt, A. E. Hickman, and W. R. Goobie, Purity is known for its cream crackers, Peppermint Nobs, Candy Kisses, and flavoured syrups. The company also makes several varieties of hard bread (hardtack), a staple of the Newfoundland diet, formerly used by fishermen as a bread substitute and as an ingredient in fish and brewis.

Purity also produces jams, including one containing partridgeberries (called lingonberries elsewhere).

References

External links
Purity Factories at Wikimapia

Food and drink companies of Canada
Companies based in St. John's, Newfoundland and Labrador
Food and drink companies established in 1924
Canadian brands
1924 establishments in Newfoundland